Peperomia graveolens is a species of plant in the genus Peperomia of the family Piperaceae. It is endemic to Ecuador.

Description
Peperomia graveolens is a short stemmed plant with few thick and round reddish stems with persistent 2-3 cm long succulent obtuse leaves. The underside of leaves is  burgundy red while the top-side has a V-shaped epidermal window showing the light green inside of the leaf. The plant is rare among Peperomia, which typically feature inflorescence with no noticeable scent, in that its flowers emit an intense foul smell, like that of mice urine.

References

graveolens
Vulnerable plants
Endemic flora of Ecuador